People v. Gissendanner, 48 N.Y.2d 543 (1979), was an important decision by the Court of Appeals of New York that placed limits on the ability of a defendant to subpoena personnel records of police officers.

Background
Undercover police officers in Irondequoit, New York, conducted a drug sting and arrested Vida Gissendanner. Gissendanner disputed the events described by officers and counsel attempted to subpoena their records for cross-examination, which the court refused to sign based on a lack of a "factual basis" since such records are considered confidential unless consent is given by the officer or a court order.  A jury found Gissendanner guilty of selling cocaine and she received a one year to life sentence.

Decision
The case established a burden of relevance for defendants wishing to access police records to confront witnesses and find exculpatory evidence. The court ruled that "there is no compulsion when requests to examine records are motivated by nothing more than impeachment of witnesses' general credibility".

A defense counsel request to access police records is now known as a Gissendanner motion.

References

External links

New York (state) state case law
1979 in United States case law
1979 in New York (state)
U.S. state criminal case law